Kippax and Methley is an electoral ward of Leeds City Council in south east Leeds, West Yorkshire, including the villages and civil parishes of Allerton Bywater, Kippax and Methley.

Boundaries 
The Kippax and Methley ward includes the following civil parishes of:
Allerton Bywater
Kippax
Ledsham
Ledston (Ledston with Ledston Luck Parish Council)
Micklefield

Councillors 

 indicates seat up for re-election.
* indicates incumbent councillor.

Elections since 2010

May 2022

May 2021

May 2019

May 2018

May 2016

May 2015

May 2014

May 2012

May 2011

May 2010

Notes

References

Wards of Leeds